Gasteren is a village in the Dutch province of Drenthe. It is a part of the municipality of Aa en Hunze, and lies about 8 km east of Assen.

The village was first mentioned between 1298 and 1304 as "in villa Ghestre, apud Ghesteren". The etymology is unclear.

The hunebed (dolmen)  is a small incomplete dolmen. It has been fenced off because there are sheep in the heath. It used to have four capstones, but only two have remained. There are also 44 burial mounds around the village.

Gasteren was home to 155 people in 1840.

Gallery

References

Populated places in Drenthe
Aa en Hunze